Thalie Tremblay (born 6 June 1967) is a Canadian fencer. She competed in the women's individual and team foil events at the 1988 and 1992 Summer Olympics.

References

1967 births
Living people
Canadian female fencers
Olympic fencers of Canada
Fencers at the 1988 Summer Olympics
Fencers at the 1992 Summer Olympics
Fencers from Montreal